Henri Germain (1824–1905)  was a French banker and politician.

Early life
Henri Germain was born on 19 February 1824 in Lyon. His father, Henri Germain, was a silk businessman, and his mother was Claudine Lupin. He received a law degree. He was a follower of Saint-Simonianism, and François Barthélemy Arlès-Dufour (1797-1872) became his mentor.

Career
Germain founded Crédit Lyonnais on 6 July 1863. It became the first bank in France to offer savings accounts with interest. The first shareholders were Saint-Simon followers like Paulin Talabot (1799–1885), Barthélemy Prosper Enfantin (1796–1864), Arlès-Dufour and Michel Chevalier (1806-1879). Two years later, in 1865, he founded the Société Foncière Lyonnaise, a real estate company. In 1892, he spearheaded the construction of the Boulevard Carnot, then known as the Boulevard de la Foncière-Lyonnaise.

Germain was a member of the General Council of Ain from 1871 to 1883. He then served as a member of the National Assembly from 1868 to 1893.

Personal life and death
Germain was married to Blanche Germain. They resided at Villa Orangini in Cimiez, Nice. Their son, André Germain (1881-1971), was a writer.

Germain died on 2 February 1905.

Bibliography
La Situation financière de la France en 1886
L’État politique de la France en 1886

References

1824 births
1905 deaths
Businesspeople from Lyon
Politicians from Lyon
French republicans
Members of the 4th Corps législatif of the Second French Empire
Members of the National Assembly (1871)
Members of the 1st Chamber of Deputies of the French Third Republic
Members of the 2nd Chamber of Deputies of the French Third Republic
Members of the 3rd Chamber of Deputies of the French Third Republic
Members of the 5th Chamber of Deputies of the French Third Republic
French bankers
Saint-Simonists